The 2020 Russian regional elections took place across three days from 11 to 13 September 2020 in 28 out of the 85 federal subjects of Russia. Elected were 18 directly-elected governors, 2 indirectly-elected governors and 11 regional parliaments. The elections also coincided with local elections in many cities. A total of 156,000 candidates stood for 78,000 positions at regional, local and municipal levels. The vote was extended over three days in a move the government said was to avoid over-crowding and reduce the risk from COVID-19.

Candidates for the ruling United Russia party and their allies won all 20 governorships with more than 50% of the vote, meaning they would not need to hold a second round run-off. However, the party lost their majority in the regional parliaments of Tomsk, Novosibirsk and Tambov.

The elections were seen as a dress rehearsal for the 2021 State Duma elections.

Campaign 
The election was led by incumbent candidates from the governing United Russia party competing against the "systemic opposition" parties including the Liberal Democratic Party, A Just Russia and the Communist Party. Opposition leader Alexei Navalny called on opposition voters to use "Smart Voting" by voting for candidates most likely to win against United Russia. Navalny fell ill three weeks before the election with Novichok poisoning while campaigning in Tomsk.

The campaign in Archangelsk Oblast came after the governor had proposed fully integrating the Nenets Autonomous Okrug into the Oblast. This had provoked demonstrations until the proposals were withdrawn.

Results

Gubernatorial elections
All incumbent governors were re-elected.

References 

2020 elections in Russia
Regional elections in Russia